Bellair Township is one of eighteen townships in Appanoose County, Iowa, United States. As of the 2010 census, its population was 554.

Geography
According to the USGS, it contains five cemeteries: Baker, County Farm, Felkner, Livengood and Numa.

References

External links
 US-Counties.com
 City-Data.com

Townships in Appanoose County, Iowa
Townships in Iowa